Campo de Belchite is a comarca in Aragon, Spain. It is located in Zaragoza Province, in the transitional area between the Iberian System and the Ebro Valley.
The administrative capital is Belchite, with 1,647 inhabitants the largest town of the comarca.

Some municipal terms of Campo de Belchite are part of the historical region of Lower Aragon.

This comarca was the scenario of violent battles during the Spanish Civil War (1936 - 1939) between fascist troops supporting general Franco and the loyalist Spanish Republican armies.

Municipal terms
Almochuel 
Almonacid de la Cuba 
Azuara 
Belchite 
Codo 
Fuendetodos 
Lagata 
Lécera 
Letux 
Moneva 
Moyuela 
Plenas 
Puebla de Albortón 
Samper del Salz 
Valmadrid

See also
Battle of Belchite (1937)
Lower Aragon
Lobo Hill

References

 Comarcas de Aragón, Campo de Belchite

Comarcas of Aragon
Geography of the Province of Zaragoza